The Maribyrnong River is a significant river in Melbourne, Australia.

Maribyrnong may also refer to:
 Maribyrnong, Victoria, a suburb of Melbourne named after the river
 Maribyrnong College, formerly Maribyrnong High School, a secondary school in the suburb of Maribyrnong
 City of Maribyrnong, a Victorian local government area through which the river passes
 Division of Maribyrnong, an electoral district for the same area in the federal Australian House of Representatives